The Ommatophorini are a tribe of moths in the family Erebidae.

Genera

Calyptis
Ommatophora

References

 
Moth tribes